Kim Sang-hee (born 18 May 1954) is a South Korean four-term parliamentarian currently serving as one of Deputy Speakers of National Assembly. Kim is the first woman to join the leadership of the South Korean parliament and become its deputy speaker.

Before entering politics, Kim dedicated her career in civil societies. In 2005 she received Order of Civil Merit for her advocacy work on women's rights - namely in abolishing patriarchal Hoju system and enacting special law on sexual violence - as one of heads of now-Women Link, a South Korean NGO.

She first entered politics through proportional representation for which she was on number 11 on her party's list. Since then Kim took multiple senior roles in her party and its succeeding parties such as a member of its Supreme Council, Chair of its Women's Committee and its deputy floor leader. Kim was the chair of Gender Equality and Family Committee of the National Assembly from 2012 to 2014.

Kim also served as the Deputy Chair of Presidential Committee on Ageing Society and Population Policy led by President Moon Jae-in from 2017 to 2020.

Kim holds a bachelor's degree in pharmacy from Ewha Womans University.

Electoral history

Awards 
  Order of Civil Merit by the government of South Korea (2005)

References 

Living people
1954 births
Ewha Womans University alumni
People from Gongju
Members of the National Assembly (South Korea)
21st-century South Korean women politicians
21st-century South Korean politicians
South Korean women's rights activists
Minjoo Party of Korea politicians
Deputy Speakers of the National Assembly (South Korea)
Female members of the National Assembly (South Korea)